Spartathlon is a  ultramarathon race held annually in Greece since 1983, between Athens and Sparti, the modern town on the site of ancient Sparta. The Spartathlon is based on the run of Pheidippides, who ran from Athens to Sparta before the Battle of Marathon in a day and a half to seek aid against the Persians. Five Royal Air Force officers attempted the course in 1982 and the competition was started the next year. The winner of the first Spartathlon, Yiannis Kouros, still holds the record for fastest time at 20 hours and 25 minutes.

As the race grew more popular, stringent entry criteria were implemented to ensure participants were fit enough to run the course. The race has 75 checkpoints where race officials disqualify runners who fail to meet time cutoffs or who are too tired to continue.

Origin
The Spartathlon aims to trace the footsteps of Pheidippides, an Athenian messenger sent to Sparta in 490 BC to seek help against the Persians in the Battle of Marathon. Pheidippides, according to an account by Greek historian Herodotus, arrived in Sparta the day after he departed. Herodotus wrote: "On the occasion of which we speak when Pheidippides was sent by the Athenian generals, and, according to his own account, saw Pan on his journey, he reached Sparta on the very next day after quitting the city of Athens."

Based on this account, John Foden, an officer of the Royal Air Force and a long distance runner, went to Greece in 1982 with four officers to test whether it was possible to cover the nearly 250 kilometres (155 miles) in a day and a half (36 hours). Three of them were successful in completing the distance: Foden himself in 37 hours and 37 minutes; John Scholtens in 34:30, and John McCarthy in 39:00. The following year a team of enthusiastic supporters (British, Greek and other nationalities) based at the British Hellenic Chamber of Commerce in Athens and led by Philhellene Michael Callaghan organised the running of the first Open International Spartathlon Race. The event was run under the auspices of SEGAS, the Hellenic Amateur Athletics Association. Forty-four men and one woman from twelve countries were entered into the first Spartathlon in 1983.

Race
The Spartathlon is usually held around late September. Runners have 36 hours to run , roughly the equivalent of six consecutive marathons, between Athens and Sparti, the site of ancient Sparta. Runners have to deal with the Greek heat in the day, the cold of the night, and the mountainous terrain. There are 75 checkpoints along the way, where runners are disqualified for safety reasons if they fail to meet time cut-offs. Many runners have crews that support them during the race, such as helping them resupply at the checkpoints. Any non-finishers are picked up by a bus and taken to Sparta together.

The race begins at 7:00 am, roughly when dawn breaks, at the foot of the Acropolis of Athens, near the Odeon of Herodes Atticus and the Agora of Athens. Runners then proceed to the site of ancient Corinth.

According to Herodotus, Pheidippides had a vision of Pan at Tegea, in what may be the first recorded case of exercise-induced hallucination. The rest of the race is a  downhill segment to the town of Sparta.

The end of the race is a statue of Leonidas I, the Spartan king who died at the Battle of Thermopylae fighting the Persians ten years after Marathon, which is placed at the end of the main street in Sparta. Runners who finish the race receive a laurel wreath and water from schoolgirls dressed in chitons, and have access to medical tents. The national anthem of the winner is also played.

No monetary award is given to any of the finishers, but winning the race is considered prestigious and generates publicity that is helpful in attracting sponsors. Unlike Pheidippides, none of the runners have to make the return run back to Athens.

Entry requirements
In order to run in this race an individual must have recently performed at least one of a number of qualifying feats, such as:
 Finishing a race of at least  in less than 10 hours (male) or 10 hours 30 minutes (female).
The criteria have been tightened at least once in the past and a ballot introduced, since the increasing prestige of the race and the gradual increase in the number of qualifying athletes mean that it is now always oversubscribed; however, elite athletes who can exceed the criteria by a large margin (25%, formerly 20%) are able to avoid the ballot and qualify automatically. Entries are now capped at 400 each year with non-automatic qualifiers chosen through a lottery system.

Records
Yiannis Kouros, who won the first Spartathlon, still holds the record time at 20:25:00. Kouros competed in four Spartathlons, won all four and held the four fastest times through the first 40 years of the competition. In 2005, he decided to trace the steps of Pheidippides completely and ran—out of competition—the Athens–Sparta–Athens distance.

Hubert Karl of Germany holds the record for most finishes with 23. András Lőw of Hungary meanwhile holds the record for most consecutive finishes with 19.

In 2017, the 35th anniversary competition had a record 264 finishers under the 36-hour cut-off time. In 2018, the later stages of the race were substantially disrupted by the Medicane Zorbas, though almost all runners capable of finishing within the cut-off time were eventually able to do so.

Following are the winners of the Spartathlon:

Men
Time = hours:minutes:seconds

Women

Time = hours:minutes:seconds

All-time top 50 performances

References

External links

 Official Website for Spartathlon
 John Foden's article on how the Spartathlon has changed over the years
 John Foden's article on time spent at refreshment points
 Spartathlon Part 1 (1982) – The Birth
 Spartathlon Part 2 (1983) – The First Race

Ultramarathons
Sport in Greece
Sparta
Battle of Marathon
Athletic culture based on Greek antiquity
Athletics competitions in Greece
1983 establishments in Greece